Digby and Annapolis was a federal electoral district in the province of Nova Scotia, Canada, that was represented in the  House of Commons of Canada from 1917 to 1935.

This riding was created in 1914 from parts of Digby and Annapolis ridings. It consisted of the county of Annapolis and the county of Digby without the municipality of Clare. In 1924, the municipality of Clare was added to the riding, so that it consisted of the counties of Digby and Annapolis. Its name was changed in 1924 to Digby—Annapolis.

The riding was abolished in 1933 when it was divided between Digby—Annapolis—Kings and Shelburne—Yarmouth—Clare ridings.

Members of Parliament

This riding elected the following Members of Parliament:

Election results

Digby and Annapolis, 1917–1925

Digby—Annapolis, 1925–1935

See also 
 List of Canadian federal electoral districts
 Past Canadian electoral districts

External links 
 Riding history for Digby—Annapolis (1924–1933) from the Library of Parliament
 Riding history for Digby and Annapolis (1914–1924) from the Library of Parliament

Former federal electoral districts of Nova Scotia